Crête-à-Pierrot was a gunboat in the Haitian Navy. It was destroyed by Admiral Hammerton Killick in 1902 to prevent it falling into the hands of a German warship.

Description
The ship displaced 950 tons. Armament comprised a 16 cm, 12 cm and four 10 cm guns, four Nordenfelt machine guns and two Maxim machine guns.

Commission
The Haitian Government commissioned an armed cruiser to be designed by Sir E J Reed and built by Earle's Shipbuilding & Engineering Co at Hull, Yorkshire, England.  The ship was launched as Crête-à-Pierrot, named for the revolutionary battle of Crête-à-Pierrot, on 7 November 1895. After arming in France, it was added to the Haitian Navy in 1896 and considered the Navy's crown jewel, the best of the four ships it possessed at the time.

Crête-à-Pierrots first commander was Captain Gilmour, from Scotland, who served under contract to Haiti.

Destruction

In 1902 Haiti was enveloped in a civil war over who would become president after the sudden resignation of Tirésias Simon Sam.  Crête-à-Pierrot was controlled by Admiral Hammerton Killick and supporters of Anténor Firmin and was used to blockade ports where Pierre Nord Alexis was gathering troops. There was a plan to use Crête-à-Pierrot to transport Firmin to Port-au-Prince while Jean Jumeau marched on Port-au-Prince by land.

In September 1902, Crête-à-Pierrot seized a German ammunition ship, Markomannia en route to provide ammunition to Alexis' forces. Alexis asked Germany for help subduing a pirate ship.  In response, Germany sent the gunboat  to find and capture Crête-à-Pierrot.

On 6 September, Crête-à-Pierrot was in port at Gonaïves, with Killick and most of the crew on Shore leave when Panther appeared.  Killick rushed aboard and ordered his crew to abandon ship.  When  all but four crew members had evacuated the ship Killick, inspired by the tale of Captain LaPorte, wrapped himself in a Haitian flag, fired the aft magazine, and blew up the ship rather than let the Germans take her. Killick and the remaining four crew members went down with the ship.

An hour later, Panther fired thirty shots at Crête-à-Pierrot to finish it off, then sailed away. The ship's rifles and machine guns were salvaged, along with the bodies of the crew that remained on board.

Gallery

References

Bibliography

1895 ships
Ships built on the Humber
Ships of the Haitian Navy
Maritime incidents in 1902
Scuttled vessels
Ships sunk by non-combat internal explosions
Shipwrecks in the Caribbean Sea
1902 in Haiti
Military history of Haiti